Richard Farries Vaughan (September 27, 1906 – June 14, 1987) was an American ice hockey player and head coach, best known for his long tenure at Princeton Tigers.

Career
Vaughan played with the Yale Bulldogs university team between 1926–1928. From 1929–1935 he was an assistant coach with the Yale Bulldogs.

Vaughan began coaching Princeton Tigers ice hockey team in 1935 and promptly raised the level of completion from a poor outing the previous year. The Tigers could not sustain the success and oscillated around the .500 mark for the next seven years. While the program was closed for two years during World War II, Vaughan was retained as head coach and resumed his work once the team returned to action in January 1946 (some sources list no coach for that abbreviated year). The post-war Tigers were not quite as good as their earlier iterations: Vaughan's squads hovered just below an even record for much of the time. He left in 1959 and was replaced by R. Norman Wood.

During the early part of his career, Vaughan published a book entitled Hockey which has since gone out of print.

Personal life
Vaughan was the son of Baptist theologian Richard Miner Vaughan.

Head coaching record
Vaughan's record as college head coach is:

References

Year of birth unknown
Year of death unknown
American ice hockey coaches
Yale Bulldogs men's ice hockey players
Princeton Tigers men's ice hockey coaches
Ice hockey coaches from Wisconsin
1906 births
Ice hockey players from Wisconsin